Iwilsoniella is a fungal genus  in the family Halosphaeriaceae. This is a monotypic genus, containing the single species Iwilsoniella rotunda.

References

Microascales
Monotypic Sordariomycetes genera